Irafsky District (Æræfy rajon; Digorian: Ирæфи район, Iræfi rajon) is an administrative and municipal district (raion), one of the eight in the Republic of North Ossetia–Alania, Russia. It is located in the west of the republic. Its administrative center is the rural locality (a selo) of Chikola. Population:  15,708 (2002 Census);  The population of Chikola accounts for 44.5% of the district's total population.

References

Notes

Sources

Districts of North Ossetia–Alania